304 may refer to:

 The year 304 or the year 304 BC.
 West Virginia's phone area code is 304.
 304 (number), the natural number
 304 (Card Game), a card game popular in Sri Lanka and Tamil Nadu
 Peugeot 304, car known as the 304
 The most common type of stainless steel, SAE 304 stainless steel 
 HTTP 304
 304, a fictional class battlecruiser in the Stargate series.
 0304 (with intentional leading zero), an album by Jewel (singer)